Paisley Tramways Company operated a tramway service in Paisley, Scotland between 1885 and 1903.

History

The Paisley Tramways Order of 1885 authorised construction of this tramway in Paisley, and the Paisley Tramways Company started a horse-drawn tramway service on 30 December 1885.

Closure

The company was taken over by Paisley District Tramways Company on 17 September 1903.

References

Tram transport in Scotland
4 ft 7¾ in gauge railways in Scotland